John Tresadern (26 September 1890 – 26 December 1959) was an English professional footballer and football manager. He played twice for the England national side.

Playing career
Tresadern, a left-half, began his career with non-league Wanstead, moving on to Southend United and then Barking Town before joining West Ham United in July 1913. He was part of the West Ham side elected to the Football League in 1919 and became a regular in their league side. Tresadern made his England debut in April 1923, in the 2–2 Home International draw with Scotland, although he was not pleased with his performance. "I was the best player Scotland had on the field", he said. He was part of the West Ham side that lost to Bolton Wanderers in the first ever FA Cup final to be held at Wembley. After just two minutes Tresadern became entangled in the crowd after taking a throw-in and was unable to return to the pitch immediately. This gave Bolton's David Jack the opportunity to shoot for goal, this shot beat West Ham goalkeeper Ted Hufton to give Bolton the lead, and hit a spectator who was standing pressed against the goal net, knocking him unconscious.

In October 1924, after 279 league games for the Hammers, Tresadern moved to Burnley. He played 22 league games for Burnley before joining Northampton Town as player-manager in May 1925.

Coaching and managerial career
Tresadern retired from playing in December 1926 after breaking his leg. He continued as manager of Northampton until October 1930 when he became manager of Crystal Palace. In June 1935 he left Palace to manage Tottenham Hotspur, but had little success at White Hart Lane, resigning to take over at Plymouth Argyle in April 1938 rather than wait to be sacked. The war interrupted his time at Plymouth, but he remained at Home Park until November 1947.

The following year he became a scout for Aston Villa before becoming manager of Chelmsford City in June 1949. He left Chelmsford in November 1950 and in December 1951 became manager of Hastings United.

He became manager of Tonbridge in April 1958 and remained in post until his death in December 1959 at the age of 69.

References

1890 births
1959 deaths
Footballers from Leytonstone
English footballers
England international footballers
Southend United F.C. players
Barking F.C. players
West Ham United F.C. players
Burnley F.C. players
Northampton Town F.C. players
English football managers
Northampton Town F.C. managers
Crystal Palace F.C. managers
Tottenham Hotspur F.C. managers
Plymouth Argyle F.C. managers
English Football League managers
Chelmsford City F.C. managers
Association football defenders
English Football League players
Hastings United F.C. (1948) managers
Tonbridge Angels F.C. managers
Aston Villa F.C. non-playing staff
FA Cup Final players
Association football scouts